Aberdeen is a city located in Harford County, Maryland, United States,  northeast of Baltimore. The population was 16,254 at the 2020 United States Census. Aberdeen is the largest municipality in Harford County.

Aberdeen is part of the Baltimore-Towson Metropolitan Statistical Area (MSA), which is the 20th-largest United States metropolitan area. The nearest city to Aberdeen is Havre de Grace,  to the northeast.

History 
Aberdeen was named after Aberdeen, Scotland, by immigrating Scots.

The James B. Baker House, Chestnut Ridge, Griffith House, Poplar Hill, Sophia's Dairy, and Swansbury are listed on the National Register of Historic Places.

Early settlements
Aberdeen began as a farming community in 1720, when Charles Calvert, the fifth Lord Baltimore, granted 1,140 acres of fertile land to Edward Hall. Located on the western edge of the Chesapeake on the main road between Alexandria and Philadelphia called the Old Post Road, the village at Halls Cross Road remained small until the Philadelphia, Wilmington and Baltimore Railroad scouted the area for a watering station in 1835. One of the railroad companies engineers was Edmund Law Rogers who saw the great potential in the place for development.

Village of Aberdeen
The Village of Aberdeen was a development by Edmund Law Rogers around 1800.  The name originated from its mother city, Aberdeen, Scotland, as a result of the close relationship the Rogers family of Baltimore had with their cousin, the Earl of Aberdeen, who became Prime Minister of Great Britain in 1852. The area now known as Aberdeen is a cluster of three communities
 Hall's Cross Roads, located at the intersection of Old Philadelphia Road (MD-7, in some places known as Old Post Road, then known as Philadelphia Post Road) and Bush River Neck Road (then the main road from Swan Creek )
 Mechanicsville, located at 
The Village of Aberdeen

As a town
In 1892, Aberdeen was incorporated as a town, under Chapter 136 of the Acts of 1892.

Board of commissioners
Upon incorporation as a town, the Aberdeen government was led by a board of commissioners.
 1892–1905, a Board President was elected annually by the commissioners
 1906–1954, this election was changed to be biennial
 1955–1992, the election of a Board President was changed back to be annual

In 1992, the Town of Aberdeen revised the Charter and became the City of Aberdeen with an Elected Mayor. 
The first mayor of the City of Aberdeen was Ruth Elliot. The second mayor was Doug Wilson, and Fred Simmons was elected mayor in 2005. Michael Bennett served as mayor from 2007 to 2015. In 2015, Patrick McGrady was elected Mayor of Aberdeen and is currently serving a 4-year term.

As a city
In 1992, Aberdeen was incorporated as a city.

2018 shooting 

On September 20, 2018, 26-year-old Snochia Moseley opened fire at a Rite Aid she temporarily worked at. She killed three people and injured three others before turning the gun on herself.

Geography

The city of Aberdeen is located at the north end of Upper Chesapeake Bay.

Climate
The climate in this area is characterized by hot, humid summers and generally mild to cool winters.  According to the Köppen Climate Classification system, Aberdeen has a humid subtropical climate, abbreviated "Cfa" on climate maps.

Attractions

B.&.O. Railroad Station
The B.&.O. Aberdeen Station is a historic train station in downtown Aberdeen. It was designed by Frank Furness and built in 1885 by the Baltimore and Ohio Railroad. The Historical Society of Harford County is currently in search of funding to save the station from being demolished.

Ripken Stadium
Ripken Stadium is the home of the Aberdeen IronBirds, located on Maryland Route 22, and named after former Baltimore Orioles star player Cal Ripken. Across the street is The Ripken Experience, a baseball complex with ten youth fields for tournaments, camps and clinics. The fields are scaled replicas of current and former MLB stadiums.

Aberdeen Festival Park

Aberdeen Festival Park is located in the heart of downtown on North Parke Street in Aberdeen. It is home to many city events such as the Aberdeen Farmers Market. It has an outside field, a playground and is home to the APG Memorial.

Victory Street Park
Victory Street Park on Victory St. features a playground, basketball court, disc-golf, and a dog park.

Demographics

2000 census
As of the census of 2000, there were 13,842 people, 5,475 households, and 3,712 families residing in the city. The racial makeup of the city was 64.90% White, 27.38% African American, 0.25% Native American, 2.48% Asian, 0.09% Pacific Islander, 1.42% from other races, and 3.47% from two or more races. Hispanic or Latino of any race were 3.45% of the population.

There were 5,475 households, out of which 32.4% had children under the age of 18 living with them, 44.8% were married couples living together, 17.2% had a female householder with no husband present, and 32.2% were non-families. 26.8% of all households were made up of individuals, and 10.7% had someone living alone who was 65 years of age or older. The average household size was 2.51 and the average family size was 3.02.

In the city, the population was spread out, with 26.4% under the age of 18, 8.7% from 18 to 24, 28.6% from 25 to 44, 23.7% from 45 to 64, and 12.7% who were 65 years of age or older. The median age was 37 years. For every 100 females, there were 90.6 males. For every 100 females age 18 and over, there were 85.8 males.

The median income for a household in the city was $39,190, and the median income for a family was $48,357. Males had a median income of $32,783 versus $26,025 for females. The per capita income for the city was $18,940. About 9.0% of families and 11.9% of the population were below the poverty line, including 15.9% of those under age 18 and 11.1% of those age 65 or over.

2010 census
As of the census of 2010, there were 14,959 people, 5,801 households, and 3,897 families residing in the city. The racial makeup of the city was 58.9% White, 30.5% African American, 0.4% Native American, 2.9% Asian, 0.3% Pacific Islander, 1.6% from other races, and 5.3% from two or more races. Hispanic or Latino of any race were 5.4% of the population.

There were 5,801 households, of which 34.3% had children under the age of 18 living with them, 43.5% were married couples living together, 18.3% had a female householder with no husband present, 5.4% had a male householder with no wife present, and 32.8% were non-families. 26.7% of all households were made up of individuals, and 10.8% had someone living alone who was 65 years of age or older. The average household size was 2.57 and the average family size was 3.09.

The median age in the city was 38 years. 24.7% of residents were under the age of 18; 9.2% were between the ages of 18 and 24; 24.9% were from 25 to 44; 28.6% were from 45 to 64; and 12.6% were 65 years of age or older. The gender makeup of the city was 47.8% male and 52.2% female.

Transportation

Roads and highways
Several major highways serve Aberdeen, with the most prominent of these being Interstate 95. I-95 briefly crosses the northwestern corner of Aberdeen and provides access to many major cities, including Baltimore, Philadelphia, Washington, D.C. and New York City. Access to Aberdeen is provided via an interchange with Maryland Route 22, which also connects directly to the Aberdeen Proving Grounds as well as to Bel Air, the county seat. U.S. Route 40 also serves the city, running parallel to I-95 from Baltimore to Wilmington and serving as an alternate route. Other state highways serving Aberdeen include Maryland Route 7, Maryland Route 132, Maryland Route 159, Maryland Route 462 and Maryland Route 715.

Rail transport
The city of Aberdeen is located on the old Philadelphia, Wilmington and Baltimore Railroad which is now operated by CSX. The new Aberdeen station is located on Amtrak's Northeast Corridor main line is served by Amtrak Northeast Regional, Maryland Area Regional Commuter (MARC) Penn Line trains and local buses.
Located just south of the East Coast Greenway, the city has access to a walking and biking trail network linking the major cities along the U.S. east coast.

Local transportation
The city of Aberdeen is part of the Harford Transit LINK public bus system. Routes 1 (Green Line), 2 (Blue Line), 3 (Silver Line) and 5 (Teal Line) connect Aberdeen with Havre de Grace, Bel Air, Edgewood, Joppatowne and Perryville. Route 4 (Yellow Line) is the Aberdeen Circulator which services the different neighborhoods within the city of Aberdeen.

Government
Since its incorporation as a city, Aberdeen has had a council-manager form of government. The Mayor and Council are elected to four-year terms in November, with terms beginning in November. The Mayor and Council define policy and appoint the City Manager who may be dismissed at any time, by vote of the Council. The City Manager, with the approval of the Council, appoints all officers and department heads who may be dismissed for cause by action of the City Manager.

Mayors of Aberdeen
Ruth Elliott, 1992–1994
Charles R. Boutin, 1994–1998
Douglas S. Wilson, 1998–2005
S. Fred Simmons, 2005–2007
Michael E. Bennett, 2007–2015
Patrick McGrady, 2015–present

Aberdeen City Council
The city council and mayor are elected by voters to 4-year terms beginning in November 2011. Their current terms expire in 2023.
 Patrick L. McGrady, Mayor
 Adam Hiob, Council President
 Sandra Landbeck, Councilwoman
 Timothy Lindecamp, Councilman
 Tandra Ridgley, Councilwoman

Harford County Council
Council District E
 Jessica Boyle-Tsottles  (Republican)

Maryland General Assembly
State Senate, District 34

State Senator Mary-Dulany James (Democrat)
House of Delegates, District 34A
 Andre Johnson Jr (Democrat)
 Steve Johnson(Democrat)

Congressional Delegation
US Senate
 Senator Benjamin L. Cardin (Democrat)
 Senator Chris Van Hollen (Democrat)
US House of Representatives, 1st Congressional District
 Congressman Andy Harris (Republican)

Aberdeen Proving Ground

Aberdeen is home to the U.S. Army's Aberdeen Proving Ground (APG). The proving ground was established by Act of Congress and came into operation in January 1918. APG is headquarters of the United States Army Test and Evaluation Command (ATEC). More than 7,500 civilians and 5,000 military personnel work at APG.

Notable people and groups
William Benjamin Baker, U.S. Congressman for Maryland's 2nd District, from 1895 to 1901
Linwood Clark, U.S. Congressman for Maryland's 2nd District, 1929–1931; born in Aberdeen on March 21, 1876
Les German, Major League Baseball pitcher, trap-shooter
David Grace (basketball), UCLA and Oregon State University basketball coach (USAF retired) 
Michael D. Griffin, head administrator of NASA
E. J. Henderson, Minnesota Vikings football player, former Maryland Terrapin
Erin Henderson, Minnesota Vikings football player, former Maryland Terrapin
Jai Lewis, college basketball player (George Mason Patriots)
Gary Neal, NBA player for Washington Wizards
Irv Pankey, Aberdeen High School, 2-time wrestling state champion (1975–1976); Penn State offensive lineman (1976–1980); NFL: Los Angeles Rams (1980–1990) Indianapolis Colts (1991–1992)
Cal Ripken Sr., longtime coach and manager in the Baltimore Orioles organization and father of Cal Ripken Jr. and Billy Ripken.
Billy Ripken, infielder for Baltimore Orioles and brother of Cal Ripken Jr.
Cal Ripken Jr., baseball Hall of Famer and Baltimore Orioles legend, grew up in Aberdeen and was a student at Aberdeen High School
Richard Slutzky, "Coach Slutzky", honoree of National Wrestling Hall of Fame, longtime Aberdeen High School coach
Lisa Welch, model, Playboy Playmate of the Month, September 1980
Steven M. Wise, animal rights lawyer and scholar, inducted into Aberdeen High School Hall of Fame
Frank Zappa, musician, lived in Aberdeen for a short period, father worked at APG
Ballyhoo!, reggae rock band
Moor Mother, musician, poet, activist

Aberdeen IronBirds

Cal Ripken Jr. and brother Billy are owners of the Aberdeen IronBirds minor league baseball team, which plays at Ripken Stadium.

Media
Aberdeen's local radio station is WAMD, broadcasting at 970 on the AM dial. Local newspaper coverage is provided by Harford County publications The Aegis and The Record. Electronic media covering Aberdeen issues is Aberdeen Patch and The Dagger Press.

Aberdeen is served by Baltimore television stations, however it is not uncommon for residents to also get Philadelphia and Harrisburg-Lancaster-York stations.

References

External links

City of Aberdeen 

 
Cities in Maryland
Cities in Harford County, Maryland
Populated places established in 1852
Scottish-American culture in Maryland
1852 establishments in Maryland
Cities in the Baltimore–Washington metropolitan area